Shirwell Hundred was the name of one of thirty two ancient administrative units of Devon, England.

The parishes in the hundred were:
Arlington,
Brendon,
Challacombe,
Charles,
Countisbury,
High Bray,
Loxhore,
Lynton,
Martinhoe,
Parracombe,
Shirwell and
Stoke Rivers

See also 
 List of hundreds of England and Wales - Devon

References 

Hundreds of Devon